Loretta is a given name.

Loretta may also refer to:

Music
 Dead Loretta, a psychedelic rock band from Newark, Delaware, U.S.
 Get Back Loretta, a funk-rock group from San Diego, California, U.S.
 "Hey Loretta", a 1973 single by Loretta Lynn from the album Love Is the Foundation
 Loretta (album), 1980 album by Loretta Lynn
 "Loretta", a song by Iron & Wine from the 2015 album Archive Series Volume No. 1

People
 Mark Loretta (born 1971), an American baseball player
 Loretta C. Van Hook (1852-1935), American missionary and educator

Places
 Loretta (Warrenton, Virginia), or Edmonium, a historic home near Warrenton, Virginia, U.S.
 Loretta, Wisconsin, an unincorporated community in the town of Draper, Sawyer County, Wisconsin, U.S.

Other uses
 1939 Loretta, an asteroid discovered in 1974

See also
 Loreto (disambiguation)
 Laura (disambiguation)
 Laurette (disambiguation)